Jon or Jonathan Brown may refer to:

Sports

Football

Association football
Jonathan Brown (English footballer) (1893–1918), English left half
Jonathan Brown (Scottish footballer) (born 1990), Scottish defender (Hearts, Livingston, Stirling)
Jonathan Brown (Welsh footballer) (born 1990), Welsh winger

Other football variants
Jon Brown (American football) (born 1992), NFL placekicker
Jonathan Brown (gridiron football) (born 1975), American defensive lineman in NFL, CFL and AFL
Jonathan Brown (Australian footballer) (born 1981), AFL centre half-forward

Other sports
Jon Brown (rower) (born 1968), American Olympian
Jon Brown (runner) (born 1971), British-Canadian Olympian

Others
Jonathan Brown (art historian) (1939–2022), American expert on painter Diego Velázquez
Jonathan David Brown (1955–2016), American record producer and audio engineer
Jonathan A. C. Brown (born 1977), American Muslim scholar at Georgetown University
Jonathan Daniel Brown (born 1989), American actor and director

See also
Jonathan Browne (1601–1643), English Anglican clergyman, Dean of Hereford from 1637
John Brown (disambiguation)
List of people with surname Brown